Víctor Morales Salas (10 May 1905 – 22 May 1938) was a Chilean football defender. He was part of Chile's team at the 1928 Summer Olympics.

References

External links

1905 births
1938 deaths
Chilean footballers
Chile international footballers
Colo-Colo footballers
1930 FIFA World Cup players
Olympic footballers of Chile
Footballers at the 1928 Summer Olympics
Association football defenders